The 2000 Cork Senior Hurling Championship was the 112th staging of the Cork Senior Hurling Championship since its establishment by the Cork County Board in 1887. The draw for the 2000 opening round fixtures took place on 12 December  1999. The championship began on 6 May 2000 and ended on 8 October 2000.

Blackrock were the defending champions, however, they were defeated by Midleton in Round 3.

On 8 October 2000, Newtownshandrum won the championship following a 0-14 to 0-11 defeat of Erin's Own in the final. This was their first championship title ever.

Imokilly's Joe Deane was the championship's top scorer with 6-32.

Team changes

To Championship

Promoted from the Cork Intermediate Hurling Championship
 Ballincollig

Results

Round 1

Round 2

Round 3

Quarter-finals

Semi-finals

Final

Championship statistics

Top scorers

Overall

In a single game

Miscellaneous

 Muskerry qualified for the semi-final stage of the championship for the first time since 1970.
 The final featured a unique pairing as it was the first ever final between Erin's Own and Newtownshandrum. Erin's Own were appearing in only their second ever final while it was a first final for Newtownshandrum.
 Newtownshandrum win their first ever title.

References

Cork Senior Hurling Championship
Cork Senior Hurling Championship